The 1975 NCAA Skiing Championships were contested at Durango Mountain ski area, north of  Durango, Colorado, at the 22nd annual NCAA-sanctioned ski tournament to determine the individual and team national champions of men's collegiate alpine, cross country skiing, and ski jumping in the United States.

Three-time defending champion Colorado, coached by alumnus Bill Marolt, captured their sixth national championship, finishing 68 points ahead of runner-up Vermont, the largest victory margin to date.

Repeat champions were Wyoming's Steiner Hybertsen (cross country), Colorado's Didrik Ellefsen (jumping), and Stig Hallingbye (nordic) of Wyoming; Hybertsen's win was his third consecutive. Denver's Peik Christensen reclaimed his slalom title of two years earlier; he entered the week as the two-time defending champion in alpine.

This was the last time for the downhill event at the NCAA championships; it was replaced by giant slalom in 1976.

Venue

This year's championships were held March 5–8 in Colorado at Durango Mountain in the San Juan Mountains of La Plata County, north of Durango. Fort Lewis College in Durango served as host.

These were the first NCAA championships at Durango,  and the seventh in Colorado; previous sites were Winter Park (1956, 1959, 1972), Crested Butte (1966), and Steamboat Springs (1968, 1969).

Team scoring

Individual events
Four events were held, which yielded six individual titles.
Wednesday: Downhill
Thursday: Cross Country
Friday: Slalom
Saturday: Jumping

See also
List of NCAA skiing programs

References

NCAA Skiing Championships
NCAA Skiing Championships
NCAA Skiing Championships
NCAA Skiing Championships
NCAA Skiing Championships
NCAA Skiing Championships
NCAA Skiing Championships
Skiing in Colorado